Zoltán Kósz (born November 26, 1967 in Budapest) is a Hungarian water polo player, who played on the gold medal squad at the 2000 Summer Olympics. Kosz also competed at the 1996 Summer Olympics, where the Hungarian team placed 4th.

He is nicknamed Cheeta, and made his debut for the national team in 1986.

Honours

National
 Olympic Games:  Gold medal - 2000
 World Championships:  Silver medal - 1998
 European Championship:  Gold medal - 1997, 1999;  Silver medal - 1995;  Bronze medal - 2001
 FINA World Cup:  Gold medal - 1995, 1999;  Bronze medal - 1997

228 present in the national team of Hungary.

Club
European competitions:
 Cup Winners' Cup Winners (2): (1995, 2002 - with Vasas)
Domestic competitions:
 Hungarian Championship (OB I): 2x (1989 - with Vasas; 2000 - with FTC)
 Hungarian Cup (Magyar Kupa): 4x (1992, 1994, 1996 (1), 2002 - with Vasas)
 Hungarian SuperCup (Szuperkupa): 1x (2001 - with Vasas)
  Croatian Cup (Kup Hrvatske): 1x (1998 - with Mladost)

Awards
 Hungarian Water Polo Player of the Year: 1995, 1997
 Member of the Hungarian team of year: 1997, 1999, 2000

 Orders
   Officer's Cross of the Order of Merit of the Republic of Hungary (2000)

See also
 Hungary men's Olympic water polo team records and statistics
 List of Olympic champions in men's water polo
 List of Olympic medalists in water polo (men)
 List of men's Olympic water polo tournament goalkeepers
 List of World Aquatics Championships medalists in water polo

References

External links
 

1967 births
Living people
Water polo players from Budapest
Hungarian male water polo players
Water polo goalkeepers
Water polo players at the 1988 Summer Olympics
Water polo players at the 1996 Summer Olympics
Water polo players at the 2000 Summer Olympics
Medalists at the 2000 Summer Olympics
Olympic gold medalists for Hungary in water polo
Hungarian water polo coaches